Agios Minas is a Greek island in Fournoi Korseon cluster. It is located east of Fournoi. Agios Minas is the third largest island of the cluster with an area of 2.5 km2.  On the island, only a few shepherds live occasionally. The population of the island is 3 inhabitants according to 2011 census. Administratively, Agios Minas belongs to Ikaria (regional unit) and Fournoi Korseon municipality.

Nature
Agios Minas along with the whole cluster belongs to the network Natura 2000. Important plant species on the island are thyme and common sage. Also, there are important birds such as Eleonora's falcon and European shag.

Historical population

References

Islands of Greece
Landforms of Ikaria (regional unit)
Islands of the North Aegean
Fournoi Korseon